Limatulichthys is a genus of catfish in the family Loricariidae and the subfamily Loricariinae.

Species
There are currently 2 recognized species in this genus:
 Limatulichthys griseus C. H. Eigenmann, 1909, synonym has Limatulichthys punctatus Regan, 1904
 Limatulichthys nasarcus Londoño-Burbano, Lefebvre & Lujan, 2014

References

Loricariini
Freshwater fish of South America
Catfish genera
Taxa named by Isaäc J. H. Isbrücker
Taxa named by Han Nijssen
Freshwater fish genera